The S-II (pronounced "S-two") was the second stage of the Saturn V rocket. It was built by North American Aviation. Using liquid hydrogen (LH2) and liquid oxygen (LOX) it had five J-2 engines in a quincunx pattern.

History

The beginning of the S-II came in December 1959 when a committee recommended the design and construction of a high-thrust, liquid hydrogen fueled engine. The contract for this engine was given to Rocketdyne and it would be later called the J-2. At the same time the S-II stage design began to take shape.

In 1961 the Marshall Space Flight Center began the process to find the contractor to build the stage. Out of the 30 aerospace companies invited to a conference where the initial requirements were laid out, only seven submitted proposals a month later. Three of these were eliminated after their proposals had been investigated. However it was then decided that the initial specifications for the entire rocket were too small and so it was decided to increase the size of the stages used. This raised difficulties for the four remaining companies as NASA had still not yet decided on various aspects of the stage including size, and the upper stages that would be placed on top.

On September 11, 1961, the contract was awarded to North American Aviation (who were also awarded the contract for the Apollo Command/Service Module), with the manufacturing plant built by the government at Seal Beach, California. 15 flight stages were to be produced.

Plans were also developed to build 10 follow-on stages, S-II-16 through -25, but funding to assemble them never materialized. These stages would have supported later Apollo missions, including those of the Apollo Applications Program.

Configuration
 When fully loaded with propellant, the S-II had a mass of about 481 tonnes. The hardware was only 7.6% of this—92.4% was liquid hydrogen and liquid oxygen.

At the bottom was the thrust structure supporting five J-2 engines in a quincunx arrangement. The center engine was fixed, while the other four were gimballed, similar to the engines on the S-IC stage below.

Instead of using an intertank (empty container between tanks) like the S-IC, the S-II used a common bulkhead (similar to that of the S-IV and S-IVB stages) that included both the top of the LOX tank and bottom of the LH2 tank. It consisted of two aluminium sheets separated by a honeycomb structure made of phenolic resin. It insulated a  temperature differential between the two tanks. The use of a common bulkhead saved 3.6 tonnes in weight, both by eliminating one bulkhead and by reducing the overall length of the stage.

It was formed by welding 12 gores (large triangular sections) and two circular pieces for the top and bottom. The gores were shaped by positioning in a 211,000 liter tank of water with three carefully orchestrated sets of underwater explosions to shape each gore.

The LH2 tank was constructed of six cylinders:  five were 2.4 meters high and the sixth 0.69 meter high. The biggest challenge was the insulation. Liquid hydrogen must be kept colder than about 20 °C above absolute zero so good insulation is very important. Initial attempts did not work well: there were bonding issues and air pockets. Initially the stage was insulated with a honeycomb material. These panels had grooves milled in the back which were purged with helium during filling. The final method was to spray insulation on by hand and trim the excess. This change saved both weight and time and avoided the issues with air pockets entirely.

The S-II was constructed vertically to aid welding and keep the large circular sections in the correct shape.

Stages built

See also
 S-IC
 S-IVB
 Apollo (spacecraft)
 MS-II

References

 
 Apollo Saturn Reference Page

Apollo program
Rocket stages